Khaleel M. Anderson (born June 11, 1996) is an American politician from the state of New York. A Democrat, Anderson has represented the 31st district of the New York State Assembly, based in Southeast Queens, since November 2020.

Early life
Anderson was born in Crown Heights, Brooklyn, before moving with his family to Far Rockaway, Queens in 2005 due to rising rent prices. Anderson graduated from Queens College in 2019 with a degree in Urban Studies.

Career
In 2020, Anderson ran as a Democrat for the New York State Assembly's 31st district, which was vacated by incumbent Michele Titus to become a Civil Court judge. With the support of progressive groups and the Working Families Party, Anderson won the Democratic primary – the real contest in the heavily-Democratic seat – over Richard David, the choice of the Queens Democratic Party, and four other candidates. After easily winning the general election, Anderson became the youngest member of the Assembly in two decades, and the youngest Black member in history.

Prior to running for office, Anderson was a member of Queens Community Board 14. He also serves on the New York City Police Department 101st Precinct Community Council and the Far Rockaway chapter of the NAACP.

References

Living people
1996 births
People from Far Rockaway, Queens
New York (state) Democrats
Queens College, City University of New York alumni
African-American state legislators in New York (state)
21st-century American politicians
21st-century African-American politicians